Georges Duplessis (19 March 1834 – 26 March 1899) was a French art historian and curator. 

Outside France he is best known for his book The Wonders of Engraving, translated into English in 1871. He was curator of the Print Room of the Bibliothèque Nationale in Paris.

Work

References

1834 births
1899 deaths
French art historians
French curators